Brunswick House is a large Georgian mansion in Vauxhall, in the London borough of Lambeth. 

Brunswick House dates back to the mid seventeenth century (the vaulted cellar still gives an idea of its size). The house was extended in 1758 on freehold land owned by the Dawson family, purchased by Richard Dawson in 1737. In 1776 it was described as a 'mansion house, with offices, coach-house, and stable, lately erected by John Dawson' (Richard Dawson's nephew and heir). The site of the house and gardens measured nearly three acres and included a piece of land with a timber dock on lease from the Dean of Canterbury.

In 1791 the house, which was then called Belmont House, was divided into two; the larger or southwestern portion was leased to a Mr David Hunter and the other portion was leased to a Mr William Anderson. Hunter's half was sold to the Gas Light and Coke Company in 1845 and purchased by the London and South Western Railway Company in 1854.

In 1811 Anderson's half was purchased by Frederick William, Duke of Brunswick-Wolfenbuttel. The Duke was a bitter opponent of Napoleon's domination of Germany, and escaped to England after taking part in the Battle of Wagram. He returned to Brunswick in 1813 to raise fresh troops, but two years later was killed at the Battle of Quatre Bras. His part of Belmont House was also purchased by the Gas Company and sold to the Railway Company in 1855.

Hymnodist Henry Williams Baker was born at Brunswick (then Belmont) House on May 27, 1821.

In January 1860 a fire severely damaged the Eastern part of the house. Within a few years the recently formed London and South West Railway Company had purchased the whole building and re-united the two parts. It became the goods' yard and locomotive works offices with the upper floors given over to a Scientific and Literary Institute for the railway's staff.

The house remained in railway ownership until 1994 when it was sold to the railway staff association that was in occupation even though the adjacent railway yards had closed in 1967. The railwayman's association sold the house again in 2002.

During the two years from 2002 to 2004 the building was squatted and extensively vandalised. A hundred and fifty years of railwaymen's club's papers and record books were burnt or stolen.

Since then a major restoration programme has seen the building brought back into use and is now home to the Brunswick House Cafe and LASSCO's (the London Architectural Salvage and Supply company) antiques showrooms

References

Historic houses
Squats in the United Kingdom
Vauxhall